Shankend Viaduct is a former railway viaduct in the Scottish Borders just over six miles south of the town of Hawick. It is a category B listed building.

It carried the Edinburgh-Carlisle main line of the North British Railway, the Waverley Line, on 15 stone arches across the shallow Langside valley and the Langside burn.

The viaduct was the last section of the Waverley Line and was opened to goods traffic on 28 June 1862 and passenger traffic on 1 July 1862. The contract for the construction of the viaduct was awarded together with the nearby southern Whitrope Tunnel on the same line.

With the closure of the entire route on 6 January 1969, the viaduct became obsolete and the rails have since been removed. In the 2000s, the monument was extensively restored by BRB (Residuary) Limited.

If this came to fruition, Shankend Viaduct would see trains again.

See also
List of railway bridges and viaducts in the United Kingdom

References

Article incorporates material from the equivalent site on German Wikipedia

Railway bridges in Scotland
Category B listed buildings in the Scottish Borders
Listed bridges in Scotland
Bridges in the Scottish Borders